Sarah Lambert is an Australian actress, writer, director and producer, working primarily in television. She is the writer and showrunner of the 2019 television adaptation of the Marele Day novel, Lambs of God for Lingo Pictures and Foxtel. The mini-series stars Ann Dowd, Jessica Barden and Essie Davis. Most recently Lamb Of Gods was nominated for Best Screenplay at the 2019 Australian Academy Cinema and Television Art awards as well as being nominated for Best Television Series or Mini Series at the 2019 Australian Writers' Guild. It also won at the 2019 Screen Producers Awards for Best Mini - Series.

She is the creator of the Nine Network television series Love Child, which she also wrote and produced.

Lambert starred in the Australian television programme Heartbreak High as teacher Christina Milano and had a recurring role as Sandy on television soap opera A Country Practice, playing Jo Loveday's best friend, Sandy Crosby from 1986-89. She is the sister of actress Anne-Louise Lambert (Picnic at Hanging Rock).

It was announced on May 17, 2021 that Lambert is the showrunner of the upcoming Amazon Prime Video series, The Lost Flowers of Alice Hart, based on the novel by Holly Ringland. The show will star Sigourney Weaver, be directed by Glendyn Ivin, and produced from the Australian team of Bruna Papandrea's Made Up Stories.

Filmography

Films

 Doctors and Nurses (1981) as Mary Grey
 Fluteman (1982) as Jane
 The Roly Poly Man (1994) as Vicki Lane
 Hey Amigos (short film) (1996) as Chicciolina
 Turtle Monkey (short film) (2002) as Jana

Television

 Against the Wind (miniseries) (1978) as Elizabeth Wiltshire
 Spring and Fall (1980) as Debra
 Bellamy (miniseries) (1981) as Cassie
 Scales of Justice (miniseries) (1983)
 E Street (1989) as Elizabeth Kennedy
 A Country Practice (1986–89) as Sandy Crosby
 Rafferty‘s Rules (1990) as Rudi Apps
 Police Rescue (1991) as Juliet
 Uncle Jack and the Dark Side of the Moon (1997) as Kate
 G.P. (1993) as Leah White
 Heartbreak High (1994) as Christina Milano
 Eat My Shorts (1995)
 Medivac (1997) as Francine Lord

Writing Credits

 Last Chance for Peace: Sierra Leone (documentary) (2000)
 Clone Story (TV film) (2002)
 Aliens Among Us (TV series) (2002)
 God in Government (TV film) (2004)
 The Alice (TV miniseries) (2005) - 1 episode
 Love My Way (TV series) (2006) - 1 episode
 Photograph (short film) (2006)
 All Saints (TV series) (2007) - 1 episode
 Resistance (TV series) (2008)
 Dance Academy (TV series) (2010/2012) - 2 episodes
 Love Child (TV series) (2014–17) - creator
 A Place to Call Home (TV series) (2015) - 1 episode
 The Doctor Blake Mysteries (TV series) (2016) - 1 episode
 Lamb of God (TV miniseries) (2019) - 4 episodes

References

External links
 
 
 Sarah Lambert at RGM Artists

1970 births
Australian television directors
Living people
Australian television actresses
Australian women television directors